Elizabeth Mary Hallam-Smith  (née Hallam; born 5 November 1950) is an English historian and information professional who was the librarian of the House of Lords Library from 2006 to 2016. She is the first female to hold the post as well as the first to hold the post in conjunction with Director of Information Services.

Early life and education
Hallam-Smith was born in Midsomer Norton, Somerset, the daughter of Edwin William Lewis Hallam and Barbara Mary Anthony Hallam.

She earned a BA (Hons) and Ph.D. at the University of London.

Career
Hallam-Smith began her career at the Public Record Office (which became The National Archives in 2003), serving as an Assistant Keeper 1976–93, Director of Public Services 1993–2004, and Director of National Advisory and Public Services 2004–2006. In 2006 she joined the Parliamentary Library.

She was appointed a Companion of the Order of the Bath in the civilian division (CB) in the 2017 New Year Honours, for services to parliament and national heritage. She is an Honorary Research Fellow at the University of East Anglia and the University of York.

Personal life
Hallam-Smith was married to Terence Stephen Smith from 1975 to 2004. They have one son and one daughter.

Publications
 (second edition 2001)

See also
Carla Hayden, first female Librarian of Congress

References

1950 births
Living people
People from Midsomer Norton
English archivists
English librarians
British women librarians
Female archivists
21st-century English historians
Alumni of the University of London
Companions of the Order of the Bath
Fellows of the Society of Antiquaries of London
Fellows of the Royal Historical Society
British women historians
Information scientists